Michael J. Stemmle (born 1967) is a computer game writer, designer, and director who cocreated some of LucasArts' adventure games in the 1990s and early 2000s.

He joined LucasArts after graduating from Stanford University, where he honed his comedy skills writing halftime shows for the Stanford Band and skits for the annual stage musical Big Game Gaieties. After 14 years at LucasArts, he left following the 2004 collapse of Sam & Max Freelance Police and after a period of freelancing, joined Perpetual Entertainment, working as Story Lead for Star Trek Online. In February 2008, he joined a number of other ex-LucasArts employees at Telltale Games.  He had worked on the first version of The Wolf Among Us before it was redesigned, and contributed to Tales from the Borderlands before he left Telltale Games in May 2014.

Game credits
1990 The Secret of Monkey Island designer, 256 colors version
1992 Indiana Jones and the Fate of Atlantis lead scripter, assistant designer, programmer
1993 Sam & Max Hit the Road co-director, co-designer
1996 Afterlife director, designer
2000 Escape from Monkey Island co-director, co-designer
2002 Star Wars Jedi Knight II: Jedi Outcast script writer
2004 Sam & Max Freelance Police (unreleased), director, designer
2005 Star Wars: Battlefront II script writer
2007 Star Trek Online (unreleased) story lead
2008 Strong Bad's Cool Game for Attractive People designer, script writer
2009 Tales of Monkey Island designer, script writer
2010 Sam & Max: The Devil's Playhouse designer, script writer
2011 Back to the Future: The Game designer, script writer
2013 Poker Night 2 script writer, programmer
2014 The Wolf Among Us (first version before redesign) designer, script writer
2014 Tales from the Borderlands designer
2021 Sam & Max: This Time It's Virtual designer, script writer

References

External links

Star Trek Online Podcast interviewing Mike Stemmle

1967 births
Living people
Lucasfilm people
Place of birth missing (living people)
Stanford University alumni
Video game designers
Video game directors
Video game writers